The 2018–19 Clemson Tigers men's basketball team represented Clemson University during the 2018–19 NCAA Division I men's basketball season. Led by ninth-year head coach Brad Brownell, the Tigers played their home games at Littlejohn Coliseum in Clemson, South Carolina as members of the Atlantic Coast Conference.

They finished the season 20–14, 9–9 in ACC Play to finish a tie for 8th place. They lost in the second round of the ACC tournament to NC State. They received an at-large bid to the National Invitation Tournament where they defeated Wright State in the first round before losing in the second round to Wichita State.

Previous season
The Tigers finished the 2017–18 season 25–10, 11–7 in ACC play to finish in a four-way tie for third place. They defeated Boston College in the quarterfinals of the ACC tournament before losing in the semifinals to Virginia. They received an at-large bid to the NCAA tournament where they defeated New Mexico State and Auburn to advance to the Sweet Sixteen where they lost to Kansas in the Sweet Sixteen. The Tigers 25 wins tied the most in program history and their 11 conference wins are the most in program history.

Offseason

Departures

Incoming transfers

2018 recruiting class

Roster

Schedule and results
Source:

|-
!colspan=12 style=| Exhibition

|-
!colspan=12 style=| Non-conference regular season

|-
!colspan=12 style=| ACC regular season

|-
!colspan=12 style=| ACC tournament

|-
!colspan=12 style=| NIT

Rankings

*AP does not release post-NCAA tournament rankings^Coaches did not release a Week 2 poll.

See also
2018–19 Clemson Tigers women's basketball team

References

Clemson Tigers men's basketball seasons
Clemson
Clemson